Motivational Jumpsuit is the 21st album by Dayton, Ohio rock group Guided by Voices. It was released in February 2014 under their own record label, Guided by Voices Inc. It reached #18 on the Top Heatseekers chart.

Track listing

References

Guided by Voices albums
2014 albums
Self-released albums
Fire Records (UK) albums